Alexandru Ionuț Mitriță (born 8 February 1995) is a Romanian professional footballer who plays as an attacking midfielder or a winger for Saudi Professional League club Al-Raed, on loan from MLS club New York City FC, and the Romania national team.

He represented several teams in Romania before moving abroad to Pescara in 2015, aged 20. After two years in Italy, Mitriță returned to his country with hometown club Universitatea Craiova, where he became an undisputed starter and won the Cupa României in the 2017–18 season. His good display earned him a transfer to the Major League Soccer in 2019, joining New York City FC as a Designated Player.

Internationally, Mitriță earned caps for Romania at youth level before making his full debut in March 2018, in a 2–1 friendly win over Israel.

Club career

Early career / Viitorul Constanța
Born in Craiova, Mitriță started his senior career with Gaz Metan Severin in 2011, and in early 2013 joined Viitorul Constanța. In September that year, aged 18, he was loaned by FC Steaua București to play for their UEFA Youth League side; his senior output for the club consisted of only one match in the Cupa României, and he returned to Viitorul the following year.

Mitriță played his first match upon his return on 23 February 2014, in a 2–1 away win against Dinamo București. He recorded his first Liga I goal on 21 May that year, in a 1–0 victory over Ceahlăul Piatra Neamț.

Pescara
In July 2015, Mitriță was transferred to Italian club Pescara for an undisclosed fee, rumoured to be around €1 million. He made 20 appearances and scored one goal in all competitions in his debut campaign, as the team achieved promotion to the Serie A. Mitriță's first goal in the Italian top division came on 22 May 2017, in a 2–0 home defeat of Palermo.

Universitatea Craiova
On 21 July 2017, Universitatea Craiova announced an agreement for the loan of Mitriță from Pescara. He made his competitive debut six days later, in a 0–1 home loss to AC Milan in the third qualifying round of the UEFA Europa League. His first goal came in a league fixture against Astra Giurgiu on 6 August, which ended 1–1. On 20 August, Mitriță scored both goals in a 2–0 win against his former team Viitorul.

On 16 December 2017, Mitriță converted a free kick in a 2–1 victory over eventual champions CFR Cluj. A few days earlier, press reported that Craiova had signed him on a permanent basis; the deal was confirmed on 17 January 2018, with the Alb-albaștrii paying a previously agreed €730,000 and Pescara retaining 15% interest. He netted his first goal of 2018 on 10 March, an 82nd-minute winner against Astra Giurgiu. On 14 April, Mitriță scored his first career hat-trick in a 4–1 home defeat of Politehnica Iași. In the Cupa României final on 27 May, he scored a goal and was named Man of the Match in a 2–0 win over Liga II side Hermannstadt. He went on to finish his first campaign in Craiova with 38 appearances and 16 goals across all competitions, being selected by the Liga Profesionistă de Fotbal in the best team of the championship play-offs.

In July 2018, Mitriță gained team captaincy and played in the 0–1 Supercupa României loss to CFR Cluj. By the end of the first half of the regular season in late October, he shared the top scorer position with FCSB striker Harlem Gnohéré after netting nine goals. On 9 November, he was sent off in the 57th minute of a 1–1 draw with Sepsi OSK after being booked twice for diving; Mitriță also cursed referee Radu Petrescu, but was only awarded a one-match suspension. The incident did not prevent him from being later nominated for Gazeta Sporturilor'''s 2018 Romanian Footballer of the Year award. On 19 December, in the last fixture of the calendar year, he scored his fourth double of the campaign in a 2–0 victory against Gaz Metan Mediaș.

New York City FC
On 4 February 2019, Mitriță officially joined Major League Soccer club New York City FC as a Designated Player. Craiova revealed that the transfer fee was US$9.1 million, which made him the third-most expensive sale of the Romanian championship at the time. Mitriță registered his debut on 8 February, celebrating his birthday by opening the scoring in a 1–1 friendly draw with Swedish team AIK in Abu Dhabi. In the season opener on 2 March, Mitriță assisted captain Alexander Ring in a 2–2 draw at Orlando City. He netted his first competitive New York City goal on the 17th that month, in a 2–2 draw with Los Angeles FC.

Mitriță became a regular goalscorer at the club, and managed a hat-trick on 25 September in a 4–1 defeat of MLS Cup 2018 champions Atlanta United. New York City lost the next and final regular fixture against New England Revolution, but still finished top of the Eastern Conference. On 23 October, Mitriță played the full 90 minutes in a 1–2 loss to Toronto FC in the Conference Semifinals, ending the year with 32 appearances and thirteen goals all competitions comprised. His individual performances earned him fourth place in Gazeta Sporturilors 2019 Romanian Footballer of the Year award.

Various loans
On 8 October 2020, Mitriță moved to Saudi Professional League side Al-Ahli on loan until 31 January 2022. Travel restrictions imposed due to the COVID-19 pandemic in the United States which did not allow him to be closer to his expecting wife were cited as the reason for the transfer. He totalled 30 games and four goals in all competitions for the club from Jeddah, before terminating his contract early in August 2021.

Mitriță was again loaned out on 31 August 2021, joining with Romanian coach Răzvan Lucescu at Greek team PAOK until the end of the season. He made his debut on 12 September, replacing Shinji Kagawa in the 63rd minute of a 0–1 home loss to PAS Giannina. On 9 February 2022, he scored a last-minute winner in a 2–1 victory over AEK Athens in the quarter-finals of the Greek Cup.

On 25 July 2022, Mitriță returned to the Saudi Professional League by joining Al-Raed on year-long loan.

International career
In March 2018, Mitriță was called up for Romania senior team's friendlies with Israel and Sweden later that month, after reportedly impressing coach Cosmin Contra. He made his debut in the former match on the 24th, and offered an assist to George Țucudean in the 2–1 win in Netanya.

Mitriță scored his first goal for the national team on 12 October 2019, aiding to a 3–0 away success against the Faroe Islands after replacing Florinel Coman in the 69th minute. Three days later, he netted again in a 1–1 draw with Norway, also counting for the UEFA Euro 2020 qualifiers.

On 11 October 2021, Mitriță scored a header in a 1–0 win over Armenia in the 2022 FIFA World Cup qualifiers, representing Romania's first goal at the new Stadionul Steaua in Bucharest.

Style of play
Mitriță is deployed as an attacking midfielder or a winger on either flank, having been noted for his pace and technical ability which allow him to take on opponents in one-on-one situations.

Personal life
Mitriță's paternal uncle, Dumitru, was also a professional footballer and played for several clubs including Universitatea Craiova and Steaua București. Mitriță stated that growing up he idolised Lionel Messi and looked to emulate him.

In October 2018, after two-time Romanian Footballer of the Year winner and Craiova legend Ilie Balaci passed away, Mitriță tattooed a piece of advice he was given by him on the back of his neck.

Career statistics

Club

International

Scores and results list Romania's goal tally first, score column indicates score after each Mitriță goal.

HonoursUniversitatea CraiovaCupa României: 2017–18
Supercupa României runner-up: 2018PAOKGreek Cup runner-up: 2021–22Individual'''
Liga I Team of the Season: 2017–18

References

External links

1995 births
Living people
Sportspeople from Craiova
Romanian footballers
Association football midfielders
Association football wingers
CS Turnu Severin players
FC Viitorul Constanța players
Delfino Pescara 1936 players
CS Universitatea Craiova players
New York City FC players
Al-Ahli Saudi FC players
PAOK FC players
Al-Raed FC players
Liga I players
Liga II players
Serie A players
Serie B players
Major League Soccer players
Designated Players (MLS)
Saudi Professional League players
Super League Greece players
Romania youth international footballers
Romania under-21 international footballers
Romania international footballers
Romanian expatriate footballers
Expatriate footballers in Italy
Romanian expatriate sportspeople in Italy
Expatriate soccer players in the United States
Romanian expatriate sportspeople in the United States
Expatriate footballers in Saudi Arabia
Romanian expatriate sportspeople in Saudi Arabia
Expatriate footballers in Greece
Romanian expatriate sportspeople in Greece